Heinrich Köhler (24 March 1881 – 22 August 1945) was a German philatelist who signed the Roll of Distinguished Philatelists in 1932. He was a stamp dealer and philatelic publisher. From 1904 until 1912 he ran and was the co-founder of Gilbert & Köhler, Paris. He is best known as the founder of the German auction house of the same name. This philatelic auction house was started 1913 in Berlin and still exists.

References and sources
References

Sources
Heinrich Köhler und seine Nachfolger (Heinrich Köhler and His successors) by Wolfgang Maassen, Schwalmtal, Germany: Phil Creativ GmbH, 2013, 492 pages

Signatories to the Roll of Distinguished Philatelists
1881 births
1945 deaths
German philatelists